Enfield Loco Platform was a railway station on the Flemington-Campsie Goods Line in Sydney, New South Wales, Australia. It opened in 1924 and was decommissioned in 1996, along with several other platforms on the line. The Enfield Intermodal Logistics Centre now exists on the site of Enfield Loco.

Neighbouring stations 
The former Enfield South Platform is located up whereas Hope Street Platform was down from the site.

References 

Disused railway stations in Sydney
Railway stations in Australia opened in 1924
Railway stations closed in 1996
1996 disestablishments in Australia